Osmar José Serraglio (born 23 May 1948) is a Brazilian lawyer, businessman, and politician affiliated to the Brazilian Democratic Movement Party (PMDB). Is current Federal Deputy for the state of Paraná and was minister of Justice and Public Security from March to May 2017. He was offered the office of the Ministry of Transparency, Supervision and CGU, but he declined, going back to his seat in the Chamber.

References

1948 births
Living people
Brazilian people of Italian descent
Centro Universitário Curitiba alumni
20th-century Brazilian lawyers
Brazilian Democratic Movement politicians
Ministers of Justice of Brazil
People from Erechim
Members of the Chamber of Deputies (Brazil) from Paraná